Coeliades forestan, the striped policeman, is a butterfly of the family Hesperiidae. It is found from Transkei to Zimbabwe and to Botswana. It is also present on Madagascar and Mauritius.

The wingspan is 45–55 mm for males and 55–64 mm for females. Adults are on wing year-round in warmer areas with peaks September to April.

The larvae feed on a wide range of plants, including Parinari curatellifolia, Lonchocarpus capassa, Combretum bracteosum, Combretum apiculatum, Solanum auriculatum, Solanum mauritianum, Millettia sutherlandii, Sphedamnocarpus rhamni, Sphedamnocarpus pruriens and Robinia pseudacacia.

Subspecies
Coeliades forestan forestan (Sub-Saharan Africa)
Coeliades forestan arbogastes (Guenee, 1863) (Madagascar & Mauritius)

Stamps 
The Republic of Chad has issued a stamp showing a Coeliades forestan in 2003.

References

Butterflies described in 1782
Coeliadinae
Butterflies of Africa
Lepidoptera of Cape Verde